Raúl Mesa (born 16 April 1982 in Zaragoza) is a male beach volleyball player from Spain, who won the gold medal at the 2005 European Championships in Moscow, Russia, partnering Pablo Herrera. He competed at the 2008 Summer Olympics.

Playing partners
 Pablo Herrera
 Javier Luna
 Javier Bosma
 Manuel Carrasco
 Francisco Rodriguez
 Sergio Martin

References

External links
 
 

1982 births
Living people
Spanish beach volleyball players
Men's beach volleyball players
Olympic beach volleyball players of Spain
Beach volleyball players at the 2008 Summer Olympics
Sportspeople from Zaragoza
People from Benidorm
Sportspeople from the Province of Alicante
Competitors at the 2018 Mediterranean Games